William Roberts (29 September 1900 – 30 April 2006), often known as Bill Roberts, was one of the final surviving British veterans of the First World War.

As a fourteen-year-old boy Roberts was present in Hartlepool during the Imperial German Navy's bombardment.

After Roberts' father was killed in the Battle of the Somme in 1916, he joined the RFC. William, who worked as an aircraft fitter, claimed to have flown with T. E. Lawrence.

After the war he became a local authority transport manager.

Roberts lived in Jacksdale, Nottinghamshire, until his death in April 2006 at the age of 105.

External links 
His obituary in The Times
The Telegraph – Obituary – Leading Aircraftman William Roberts
An interview with him, from 2005

1900 births
2006 deaths
British Army personnel of World War I
Royal Air Force personnel of World War I
English centenarians
Men centenarians
Recipients of the Legion of Honour
Royal Air Force airmen
Royal Flying Corps soldiers
People from Jacksdale
British Army soldiers